Ergosines are ergoloid-like chemicals made by Claviceps purpurea.

External links
 Incorporation of thiazolidine-4-carbozylic acid into ergosine by Claviceps purpurea

Ergot alkaloids
Indolizidines
Lactams